"Home" is a song by English-Irish boy band One Direction from the Perfect EP. It was released as part of the digital EP on iTunes and Apple Music on 20 October 2015. The song is included as a bonus track on the Japanese version of Made in the A.M.. This song was written by Louis Tomlinson, Liam Payne, and Jamie Scott.

It won a Teen Choice Award at the 2016 ceremony.

Background
On 22 October 2015, One Direction released the second single "Perfect" from their fifth studio album, Made in the A.M., and released "Home" as a promotional single along with the purchase of the EP, Perfect.

Charts

References

One Direction songs
2015 songs
Songs written by Jamie Scott
Songs written by Louis Tomlinson
Songs written by Liam Payne